Moffat Beach is a coastal suburb in the Sunshine Coast Region, Queensland, Australia.

Geography 
Moffat Beach is within the Caloundra urban centre, located directly north-east of Caloundra CBD.

History 
The suburb and beach were named after James Campbell Moffat, a chemist from Brisbane, who acquired  of coastal land at Caloundra on 18 August 1882. A year later, he built a holiday house c. 500 metres south-east of Moffat Beach on the headland which now also bears his name.

The Queen of the Colonies pandanus tree stood on the headland above the site where 13 passengers from the Queen of the Colonies shipwreck were cast ashore in a small boat during stormy weather in April 1863 while returning from Moreton Island. In 1963, a concrete memorial was erected on the site.

In 1888, Caloundra's first guesthouse "Sea Glint" opened on a ridge overlooking present-day Moffat Beach. During this time Sir Thomas McIllwraith, Premier of Queensland, was a regular visitor to Sea Glint on the shore of Tooway Lake or Wilson's Lake as it was then known 

The median age of the Moffat Beach population was 44 years, above both the Queensland median of 37 and the Australian median of 38. 77.4% of people were born in Australia. The next most common countries of birth were England (5.1%) and New Zealand (4.5%). 92% of people only spoke English at home. Religious affiliations in Moffat Beach were predominantly No Religion (33.5%), Catholic (23.1%) and Anglican (15.4%).

Education 
There are no schools in Moffat Beach. The nearest primary school is Caloundra State School in neighbouring Caloundra. The nearest secondary school is Caloundra State High School also in Caloundra.

Shopping and eating 
A bakery, convenience store, doctors' surgery and post office are located at Buccleugh Street.

Cafes, restaurants and takeaways as well as gift shops, an art gallery and craft brewery are located in Seaview Terrace and around the corner into Roderick Street.

Parks and recreation 
Eleanor Shipley Park stretches from Tooway Lake through to the cafes of Seaview Terrace. Barbecue facilities and picnic shelters are provided, as well as a children's play area and easy access to Moffat beach.

Roslin Park in Roslin Street provides a children's play area and is dog-friendly.

On Moffat Beach, dogs are allowed off-leash before 8am and after 4pm. The beach itself is unpatrolled.

The Des Dywer walking track is an oceanway that runs from Moffat Beach to Bulcock beach, following the coastline on cliffs and boardwalks.

Surfing 
Moffat Beach is protected from southerly winds by Moffat Headland which provides a sought-after surf break.

One of Australia's longest-running surf competitions, the Pa and Ma Bendall Surfing Classic is held every Easter in honour of local surfing legends Charles "Pa" and Marjorie "Ma" Bendall.

References

External links
 
 

Suburbs of the Sunshine Coast Region
Caloundra
Beaches of Queensland